The 2018 WAFF U-15 Girls Championship was the 1st edition of the WAFF U-15 Girls Championship, an international women's football youth tournament organised by the West Asian Football Federation (WAFF). It was held in UAE from 7 to 15 April 2018. Jordan won their first title, after beating Lebanon on penalties in the final.

Participating teams
Six Teams entered the WAFF U-15 Girls Championship final tournament.

Group stage

Group A

Group B

Placement matches

Fifth place match

Knockout stage

Semi-finals

Third place match

Final

Champion

Player awards
The following awards were given at the conclusion of the tournament:

Goalscorers

Final ranking

References

External links

U15 2018
WAFF U15
WAFF U15